In the mathematical field of differential geometry, the Kulkarni–Nomizu product (named for Ravindra Shripad Kulkarni and Katsumi Nomizu) is defined for two -tensors and gives as a result a -tensor.

Definition
If h and k are symmetric -tensors, then the product is defined via:

Note that , as it is clear from the second expression.  

With respect to a basis  of the tangent space, it takes the compact form

where  denotes the total antisymmetrisation symbol.

The Kulkarni–Nomizu product is a special case of the product in the graded algebra

where, on simple elements,

( denotes the symmetric product).

Properties
The Kulkarni–Nomizu product of a pair of symmetric tensors has the algebraic symmetries of the Riemann tensor. For instance, on space forms (i.e. spaces of constant sectional curvature) and two-dimensional smooth Riemannian manifolds, the Riemann curvature tensor has a simple expression in terms of the Kulkarni–Nomizu product of the metric  with itself; namely, if we denote by

the -curvature tensor and by

where  is the scalar curvature and

is the Ricci tensor, which in components reads .
Expanding the Kulkarni–Nomizu product  using the definition from above, one obtains

This is the same expression as stated in the article on the Riemann curvature tensor.

For this very reason, it is commonly used to express the contribution that the Ricci curvature (or rather, the Schouten tensor) and the Weyl tensor each makes to the curvature of a Riemannian manifold.  This so-called Ricci decomposition is useful in differential geometry.

When there is a metric tensor g, the Kulkarni–Nomizu product of g with itself is the identity endomorphism of the space of 2-forms, Ω2(M), under the identification (using the metric) of the endomorphism ring End(Ω2(M)) with the tensor product Ω2(M) ⊗ Ω2(M).

A Riemannian manifold has constant sectional curvature k if and only if the Riemann tensor has the form

where g is the metric tensor.

Notes

References
.
 

Differential geometry
Tensors